Sema Kaygusuz (born August 29, 1972, in Samsun, Turkey) is a novelist, playwright, essayist, and short story writer from Turkey. Her work has been translated into English, Italian, German, French, Swedish, and Norwegian. She won a Yunus Nadi Award in 2016 for her novel Laughter of the Barbarian. Among other accolades, she is a recipient of the Cevdet-Kudret-Literature Award, the France-Turquie Literary Award, and was named laureate of the German Friedrich Rückert Prize. The English translation of her novel Yüzünde Bir Yer (Every Fire You Tend) won both the TA First Translation Prize and an English PEN Award. She currently resides in Istanbul.

As a screenwriter, she co-wrote the screenplay for the 2008 film Pandora's Box (Turkish: Pandora'nın Kutusu) with director Yeşim Ustaoğlu.

Selected works

In Turkish 
 Ortadan Yarısından (short story), 1997
 Sandık Lekesi (short story), 2000
 Doyma Noktası (short story), 2002
 Esir Sözler Kuyusu (short story), 2004
 Yere Düşen Dualar (novel), 2006
 Yüzünde Bir Yer (novel), 2009
 Karaduygun (short story), 2012
 Barbarin kahkahasi (novel), 2016
 Aramızdaki ağaç yazılar (essays), 2019

Translated works  
 Wein und Gold Roman, translated by Barbara Yurtdas and Hüseyin Yurtdas (Suhrkamp Verlag, 2008)
 La chute des prières: roman, translated by Noémi Cingöz (Actes Sud, 2009)
 Ce lieu sur ton visage: roman, translated by Catherine Erikan (Actes Sud, 2013)
 En bønn faller til jorden, translated by Cora Skylstad (Cappelen Damm, 2015)
 Platsen i ditt ansikte, translated by Ulla Bruncrona (Ersatz, 2015)
 The Well of Trapped Words, translated by Maureen Freely (Comma Press, 2015)
 L'éclat de rire du barbare, translated by Catherine Erikan (Lettres turques, 2017)
 Every Fire You Tend, translated by Nicholas Glastonbury (Tilted Axis Press, 2019)
 La risata del barbaro, translated by Giulia Ansaldo (Voland, 2020)
 The Passenger: Turkey (Europa Editions, 2021)

References

Living people
Turkish novelists
21st-century Turkish women writers
Turkish women novelists
1972 births